Russellville is an unincorporated community in Monroe County, in the U.S. state of Georgia.

History
A post office called Russellville was established in 1844, and remained in operation until 1906. The community most likely was named after Alexander Russell, a pioneer settler.

References

Unincorporated communities in Georgia (U.S. state)
Unincorporated communities in Monroe County, Georgia